Lorraine Remer is research professor at University of Maryland, Baltimore County known for her work on developing algorithms to study aerosol particles using satellites with a particular focus on how aerosols impact climate processes.

Education and career 
Remer has a B.S. in Atmospheric Science from the University of California Davis (1980), an M.S. in Oceanography from Scripps Institution of Oceanography, University of California, San Diego (1983), and a Ph.D. in Atmospheric Science from University of California Davis (1991).

Starting in 1991, she worked for Science Systems and Applications, Inc. as a support scientist at the National Aeronautics and Space Agency (NASA). From 1998 to 2012, she worked at NASA's Goddard Space Flight Center. In 2012, she moved to the University of Maryland, Baltimore Country where she became a research professor in the Joint Center for Earth Systems Technology.

She co-founded AirPhoton, a company whose work includes measuring particles in the atmosphere, and she currently serves as the company's Chief Science Officer. AirPhoton's work includes characterizing the particles found in pollution from a space-based platform.

Research 
As a child, Remer was interested in the sea and maritime studies, and as she grew older she sought out "environmental science that was hard science" which led her to atmospheric sciences.

Remer's research involves tracking dust in the air using space-based platforms and quantifies how aerosols alter climate conditions. While at NASA, Remer worked on the algorithms needed to understand aerosol particles using the Moderate Resolution Imaging Spectroradiometer (MODIS) sensors that are part of the payload on the Terra and Aqua satellites. Remer's research includes work on smoke, dust, aerosol particles over Atlantic Ocean and smoke and clouds in the Amazon River area. Remer has also been involved in research quantifying the balance of pollution from US-based sites relative to other geographical regions.

Selected publications

Awards and honors 

 June Bacon-Bercey Scholarship for Women in Atmospheric Sciences (1986)
 Thomson Reuters Highly Cited Researchers list (2014)
 Fellow, American Geophysical Union (2015)
 Faculty Excellence Award, University of Maryland, Baltimore County (2019)

Reference section

External links 

Fellows of the American Geophysical Union
University of California, Davis alumni
University of California, San Diego alumni
University of Maryland, Baltimore County faculty
Space scientists
Aerosol scientists
Living people
Year of birth missing (living people)